General Wayne A. Downing Peoria International Airport  is a civil/military public airport five miles west of Peoria, in Peoria County, Illinois, United States. It is on the northwest edge of Bartonville, near Bellevue. It is owned by the Metropolitan Airport Authority of Peoria, which often refers to it as Peoria International Airport. It was formerly the Greater Peoria Regional Airport.

The Federal Aviation Administration (FAA) National Plan of Integrated Airport Systems for 2017–2021 categorized it as a non-hub primary commercial service facility. Federal Aviation Administration records say the airport had 312,378 passenger boardings (enplanements) in calendar year 2017 and 328,769 in 2018.

It is the fourth-busiest of the 12 commercial airports in Illinois.

History

On May 19, 1932, the citizens of Peoria voted to have an airport. On 195 acres (0.8 km²), American Airways (now American Airlines) and Chicago and Southern Airlines brought in airmail and passenger service on four shale-surfaced runways. The land was purchased by 261 Peoria businessmen who formed the Peoria Airport, Inc. It was turned over to the Peoria Park District in 1937, then to the newly formed Metropolitan Airport Authority of Peoria in 1950.

American Airlines and Chicago and Southern started flights to Peoria in 1945; C&S pulled out in 1949-50 and American left in 1962, then returned for a couple years starting in 1991. TWA served Peoria 1947 to 1960 and 1983 to 1991; Continental 1977 to 1983, United 1984 to 1995, Republic/Northwest 1986 to 1988, and Ozark from 1950 until it merged into TWA. Peoria's first jets were Ozark DC9s in 1966. A curious artifact of airline regulation: Peoria had never had nonstop flights beyond Chicago, but in 1969 Ozark was allowed a nonstop to New York La Guardia.

On April 25, 2007, the Greater Peoria Airport Authority announced a new nine-gate terminal will be built and the old terminal demolished. On October 10, 2008, the airport was renamed "General Wayne A. Downing Peoria International Airport" during a groundbreaking ceremony attended by Ross Perot, a friend of the late Wayne A. Downing. The new terminal, designed by Reynolds, Smith & Hills of Jacksonville, Florida and the Dewberry architecture firm of Peoria, and built by Turner Construction, opened on April 27, 2011.
As of August 24, 2012, the airport was in negotiations for international flights using a temporary customs facility.

In 2016, the Ray Lahood International Arrivals Terminal was completed, with more gates, TSA services, and a US Customs Port of Entry facility.

In  December 2020, Delta Air Lines pulled all its flights from Peoria.

Facilities & Aircraft
Peoria International Airport covers 3,800 acres (1,538 ha) at an elevation of 661 feet (201 m). It has two runways: 13/31 is 10,104 by 150 feet (3,080 x 46 m) concrete; 4/22 is 8,004 by 150 feet (2,440 x 46 m) concrete.

For the 12-month period ending December 31, 2021, the airport had about 45,000 operations, an average of 123 per day: 54% general aviation, 20% military, 14% commercial, and 11% air taxi. In June 2018, 69 aircraft were based at this airport: 40 single-engine, 8 jet, 14 military, 3 helicopter, and 4 multi-engine.

Military
The airport is co-located with the Peoria Air National Guard Base, home to the 182d Airlift Wing (182 AW) of the Illinois Air National Guard. This Air National Guard unit is operationally-gained by the Air Mobility Command (AMC) and consists of Lockheed C-130H Hercules aircraft. The airport is also home to the Illinois Army National Guard's Army Aviation Support Facility No. 3 and 1st Battalion, 106th Aviation Regiment, currently operating the Boeing CH-47 "Chinook" helicopter.

Airlines and destinations

Passenger

Cargo

Statistics

Airline market share

Accidents and incidents
On October 21, 1971, Chicago & Southern Airlines Flight 804, an ATECO Westwind II, crashed 2 miles west of PIA after striking power lines in limited visibility and low clouds, killing all 14 passengers and two crew. The cause was found to be the pilot knowingly descending below the minimum descent altitude before being visual with the runway.

Notes

References

External links

 General Wayne A. Downing Peoria International Airport – official website
 Peoria Air Guard – official website
 Aerial image as of April 1998 from USGS The National Map
 
 
 Airport diagram for 1956

Peoria
Transportation buildings and structures in Peoria County, Illinois